Yuraq Mach'ay (Quechua yuraq white, mach'ay cave, "white cave", Hispanicized spelling Yuracmachay) is an archaeological site with rock paintings in Peru. It lies in the Pasco Region, Daniel Alcides Carrión Province, Chacayan District.

See also 
 Kuntuyuq

References

Archaeological sites in Pasco Region
Archaeological sites in Peru
Rock art in South America